Paul Steigerwald (born August 6, 1954) is an Emmy award winning American sportscaster, who through the 2016-17 NHL hockey season worked as the Pittsburgh Penguins' primary television announcer on Root Sports Pittsburgh (now AT&T SportsNet Pittsburgh).

Minor leagues
Steigerwald became a hockey fan growing up in Pittsburgh's South Hills. One of his neighbors was Pittsburgh Penguins general manager Jack Riley, who would provide tickets for the poorly attended games. Steigerwald developed an interest in hockey and played at the club level while attending Kent State University. After graduating, Steigerwald would start his broadcast career with the Johnstown Red Wings of the Eastern Hockey League. WJNL, the local radio affiliate of the Johnstown Red Wings paid Steigerwald $110 a week to provide commentary for all 70 games that season. With a 24-45-1 record and amidst a failing economy in the Johnstown area, the Johnstown Red Wings ceased operations in 1980. The Eastern Hockey League later folded the following year.

Steigerwald was later the radio play-by-play announcer for the Altoona Curve, the AA affiliate of the Pittsburgh Pirates, from 2005 to 2007.

Pittsburgh Penguins
The Penguins hired Steigerwald as their marketing director at age 25, and he became their radio color analyst in 1985. FSN Pittsburgh (now AT&T SportsNet Pittsburgh) hired him on 29 June 2006, as its TV play-by-play announcer after it declined to renew the contract of fellow Penguins broadcaster Mike Lange, who was later hired by the team exclusively as its radio play-by-play announcer. Steigerwald denied persistent rumors that he worked behind the scenes to secure Lange's dismissal. On 18 August 2011, Steigerwald and color analyst Bob Errey were re-signed by Root Sports to multi-year contracts. During a Penguins/Capitals game on 19 March 2013; two fans were spotted with a large picture of Steigerwald on a stick. Bob Errey referred to the prop as "Steigy on a Stick," which became an instant viral hit with Penguins fans.

On 16 May 2017, Root Sports and the Pittsburgh Penguins announced that, starting in the 2017-18 hockey season, Steigerwald would transition to the Penguins' front office in a new role with the communications and marketing department. Steve Mears, an NHL Network broadcaster and former radio play-by-play voice of the New York Islanders, replaced Paul Steigerwald as the network's TV play-by-play broadcaster for Penguins games.

Cameo
Steigerwald appeared in the Jean-Claude Van Damme action movie Sudden Death.  Playing himself alongside Mike Lange, he provided commentary for a hockey game during which Van Damme's character fought off terrorists; his part climaxed with him exclaiming "holy shit!" when the scoreboard above the arena was damaged.

Personal
He is the brother of fellow Pittsburgh sports media member, John Steigerwald, former Pittsburgh Post-Gazette reporter and Pittsburgh Tribune-Review libertarian columnist Bill Steigerwald, and blues rock guitarist Danny Stag.  He is the uncle of VICE columnist and former Reason associate editor Lucy Steigerwald.

He was raised, and continues to live, in the Pittsburgh suburb Mt. Lebanon, Pennsylvania.

References

 
 Altoona Curve Paul Steigerwald page
 In defense of Steigerwald

1954 births
Living people
People from Mt. Lebanon, Pennsylvania
Kent State University alumni
National Hockey League broadcasters
Pittsburgh Penguins announcers
Minor League Baseball broadcasters